Louis Martens Kunkel (born October 13, 1949) is an American geneticist and member of the National Academy of Sciences (NAS). His father (Henry G. Kunkel) and grandfather (Louis O. Kunkel) were also scientists and NAS members. Kunkel came from a Lutheran background and attended Lutheran schools in youth. He later graduated from Gettysburg College in 1971. He obtained his PhD from Johns Hopkins University. He is noted for discovering dystrophin, which is relevant to muscular dystrophy research.

Awards 
 1988 GlaxoSmithKline Prize
 1989 Gairdner Foundation International Award
 1991 E. Mead Johnson Award
 2004 William Allan Award
 2009 March of Dimes Prize in Developmental Biology

References

External links 
HMS Department of Genetics page

American geneticists
Gettysburg College alumni
Members of the United States National Academy of Sciences
Johns Hopkins University alumni
1949 births
Living people